is a Japanese singer, known for her work on the Cowboy Bebop soundtrack with Yoko Kanno and for her 1980 hit Tasogare.

Early life and solo career
Her career started in 1979 when she participated and won the prize in Yamaha Music Foundation's Cocky Pop, a contest for young singers in Japan. Leading from that she debuted in 1979 with the single . A year later she released her first album, Tasogare (1980). She followed with albums like The Day Before Yesterday (1984), Flying Elephants (1985), Embassy (1986), Woman Tone (1988) and 1958 (1989). She also collaborated with many artists, e.g. in 1993 she worked on project Yamane Mai Kubota Haruo Unit with Haruo Kubota. The same year she began working with Yoko Kanno on anime soundtracks. In 1997 she moved from Tokyo to near Mount Fuji and became an independent musician.

Later career
In 1995 she started playing with New Archaic Smile (NAS), a Japanese band where Mai Yamane was a vocalist. The rest of the band was Mai's sister Eiko Yamane (who also was the vocalist in UGUISS), brother Satoru Yamane and the Sano brothers Satoshi and Atsushi. In 1997 the Futsuu no Uta single was born in collaboration with June Chiki Chikuma. Yamane recorded 3 more albums with New Archaic Smile: Kin no Himo in 2001, Yasashii kimochi in 2003 and Yakitori no uta in 2004.

Yamane has continuously held concerts, such as in 2000 at the Inochi no Matsuri ("Festival of Life") in Nagano, a 2002 Paris concert, at a Global Village event during Expo 2005 in Aichi, and in 2007 at Seoul as a member of the Yoko Kanno team. In 2011 she adopted the artist name  and began hosting sessions for workshops and healing.

In 2017, her song "Tasogare" gained attention as the city pop genre got renewed interest, even leading to sampling of it in genres like future funk. In 2019, producer Pierre Bourne and hip hop artists Young Nudy and Playboi Carti used a sample of the song on their unreleased track "Pissy Pamper". A leaked version of the song topped the Spotify US Viral 50 chart before being taken down.

Personal life
In 1996 she married Takao Yamada (山田孝男), a top author on meditation in Japan. For seven years until his death in 2003 she worked as an assistant in his seminars.

Discography

Albums
Tasogare (1980)
Sorry (1981)
Will (1982) 
The Day Before Yesterday (1984)
月光浴 (1984)
Flying Elephants (1985)
Embassy (1986)
Best (1987)
Woman Tone (1988)
1958 (1989)
Mai Yamane and Haruo Kubota Unit (1993)
Mai Yamane with New Archaic Smile (1997)
Kin no Himo (2001)
Yasashi kimochi w/New Archaic Smile (2003)
Mai Yamane the Celebrations, Inori no uta (2004)
Mai Yamane and Visions, Bird of Paradise (2007)
Kimi-wo-aishiteru Kagayaki-no-oto (2007)
A-sha Freedoms (2 song special release, 2012)

Vocals (anime)

Cowboy Bebop (1997 anime) OST:
 "Want It All Back"
 "Pushing The Sky"
 "Rain" (Demo version)
 "Don't Bother None"
 "See You Space Cowboy"
 "Mushroom Hunting" (Live version)
 "Blue"
 "The Real Folk Blues"
 "Gotta Knock a Little Harder"

Black Jack OST:
 "Invisible Love" (Starting & ending song)

Mirage of Blaze OST:
 "Vision of Flames "
 "Tears of Indigo"
 "Blaze"
 "Pearly Gate"
 "Insanity"
 "Chikai ~ Book of the Days"
 "Lamentation" (feat. Yoko Ueno)

Macross Plus OST:
 "After in the dark "

Vision of Escaflowne OST:
 "If You"

Darker Than BLACK OST:
 "ScatCat"
 "No One's Home"

Cowboy Bebop (2021 TV series) OST:
 "Cat Attack (Part 1)"

References

External links 
 

Japanese women pop singers
English-language singers from Japan
Living people
1958 births
Musicians from Shimane Prefecture
20th-century Japanese women singers
20th-century Japanese singers
21st-century Japanese women singers
21st-century Japanese singers